The 2016 Dubai Women's Sevens was the opening tournament of the 2016–17 World Rugby Women's Sevens Series. It was held on 1–2 December 2016 at The Sevens Stadium in Dubai, and was the 5th edition of the Women's Dubai Sevens as part of the World Rugby Women's Sevens Series. The defending champions Australia started their first game against the invited South Africans. The opening game of the Dubai tournament matched Spain up against England.

Bill Beaumont, the World Rugby Chairman, said: "With the excitement of the Olympic Games still fresh in people's memories, anticipation has never been higher ahead of a new HSBC World Rugby Women's Sevens Series season kicking off".

Format
The teams are drawn into three pools of four teams each. Each team plays every other team in their pool once. The top two teams from each pool advance to the Cup/Plate brackets while the top 2 third place teams also compete in the Cup/Plate. The other teams from each group play-off for the Challenge Trophy.

Teams
The participating teams include:

Pool stage

Pool A

Pool B

Pool C

Knockout stage

Challenge Trophy

5th place

Cup

Tournament placings

<small>Source:

See also
 World Rugby Women's Sevens Series
 2016–17 World Rugby Women's Sevens Series
 World Rugby

References

2016-17
2016–17 World Rugby Women's Sevens Series
rugby union
2016 in women's rugby union
2016 rugby sevens competitions
2016 in Asian rugby union